

Major events
May 3 (April 22 in the Julian calendar), 1725—Azov Governorate was renamed Voronezh Governorate.

Subdivisions (as of 1725)
Archangelgorod Governorate (Архангелогородская губерния)
subdivided into 4 provinces:
Archangelgorod Province (Архангелогородская провинция)
Galich Province (Галичская провинция)
Ustyug Province (Устюжская провинция)
Vologda Province (Вологодская провинция)
Astrakhan Governorate (Астраханская губерния)
not subdivided
Kazan Governorate (Казанская губерния)
subdivided into 4 provinces:
Kazan Province (Казанская провинция)
Penza Province (Пензенская провинция)
Sviyaga Province (Свияжская провинция)
Ufa Province (Уфимская провинция)
Kiev Governorate (Киевская губерния)
subdivided into 4 provinces:
Belgorod Province (Белгородская провинция)
Kiev Province (Киевская провинция)
Oryol Province (Орловская провинция)
Sevsk Province (Севская провинция)
Moscow Governorate (Московская губерния)
subdivided into 9 provinces:
Kaluga Province (Калужская провинция)
Kostroma Province (Костромская провинция)
Moscow Province (Московская провинция)
Pereyaslavl-Ryazan Province (Переяславль-Рязанская провинция)
Pereyaslavl-Zalessk Province (Переяславско-Залесская провинция)
Suzdal Province (Суздальская провинция)
Tula Province (Тульская провинция)
Vladimir Province (Владимирская провинция)
Yuryevo-Polsk Province (Юрьево-Польская провинция)
Nizhny Novgorod Governorate (Нижегородская губерния)
subdivided into 3 provinces:
Alatyr Province (Алатырская провинция)
Arzamas Province (Арзамасская провинция)
Nizhny Novgorod Province (Нижегородская провинция)
Revel Governorate (Ревельская губерния)
not subdivided
Riga Governorate (Рижская губерния)
subdivided into 2 provinces:
Riga Province (Рижская провинция)
Smolensk Province (Смоленская провинция)
St. Petersburg Governorate (Санкт-Петербургская губерния)
subdivided into 11 provinces:
Belozersk Province (Белозерская провинция)
Narva Province (Нарвская провинция)
Novgorod Province (Новгородская провинция)
Petersburg Province (Петербургская провинция)
Poshekhonye Province (Пошехонская провинция)
Pskov Province (Псковская провинция)
Tver Province (Тверская провинция)
Uglich Province (Угличская провинция)
Velikiye Luki Province (Великолуцкая провинция)
Vyborg Province (Выборгская провинция)
Yaroslavl Province (Ярославская провинция)
Siberian Governorate (Сибирская губерния)
subdivided into 5 provinces:
Irkutsk Province (Иркутская провинция)
Sol-Kamsk Province (Соль-Камская провинция)
Tobolsk Province (Тобольская провинция)
Vyatka Province (Вятская  провинция)
Yenisei Province (Енисейская провинция)
Voronezh Governorate (Воронежская губерния)
subdivided into 5 provinces:
Bakhmut Province (Бахмутская провинция)
Shatsk Province (Шацкая провинция)
Tambov Province (Тамбовская провинция)
Voronezh Province (Воронежская провинция)
Yeletsk Province (Елецкая провинция)

References

1725
1720s in Russia